Guillermo González Calderoni (1949 – 5 February 2003) was a commander of the Mexican Federal Judicial Police, and one of the strongmen of the Attorney General of Mexico, who went on to accuse Raul Salinas de Gortari, the brother of former president Carlos Salinas de Gortari, of being involved in drug trafficking. Calderoni was the subject of various allegations of corruption.

Biography 
Calderoni was born in Reynosa, Tamaulipas, Mexico in a well-off family. His father held an important post at Pemex, the state-owned petroleum company. His mother was Italian-American. Besides his native Spanish, he was fluent in English and French. In contrast to Spanish naming customs, he is often referred to by his mother's last name, rather than his father's more common last name. 

In the early 1980s, he enrolled as a federal officer on the United States-Mexico border and rose quickly to the rank of commander. Not everything was as it seemed: Calderoni expressed contempt for Americans and Drug Enforcement Administration agents, and admitted to smuggling cocaine across the border into El Paso, Texas.

He was murdered on 5 February 2003, in McAllen, Texas.

In popular culture 
In the 2018 Netflix drama, Narcos: Mexico, Calderoni is played by actor Julio Cesar Cedillo.

References

Sources 
Articles

Books

1949 births
2003 deaths
Date of birth missing
People from Reynosa
Male murder victims
Mexican people of American descent
Mexican people of Italian descent
Mexican police officers
People murdered in Texas